The Ak Orda Presidential Palace (Aqorda rezidentsiyasy) is the official workplace of the President of Kazakhstan, located in the capital city of Astana. The Palace was built within three years, and officially opened in 2004.  It was built by the Mabetex Group, founded  by Behgjet Pacolli, 3rd President of Kosovo and 1st Deputy Prime Minister of Kosovo.

Situated on the left bank of the Ishim (Esil) River, it is the president’s place of work and houses the staff of the Presidential Administration; it is not the president’s place of residence.  The palace includes a blue and gold dome topped with a spire.  This golden statue atop the dome includes a sun with 32 rays at its apex, and also includes a steppe eagle flying beneath the sun.

The building's height (including the spire) is 80 meters.  The first floor includes a Grand Central Hall, the Hall of Press Conferences, the Gala Hall, and the Winter Garden.  The second floor includes offices, while the third floor is used for international events, and includes various halls (Marble Hall; Golden Hall; Oval Hall; Oriental Hall, built in the form of a yurt; the Hall of Extended Negotiations).  The fourth floor includes a Dome Hall, meeting hall for the Government of the Republic, and the Library. 

The color gold features prominently throughout the complex and twenty-one types of marble were used for the floor patterns.

Gallery

References

External links

 

Official residences in Kazakhstan
Buildings and structures in Astana
Presidential residences
Government buildings completed in 2004
2004 establishments in Kazakhstan